Improvisations for Cello and Guitar is an album by acoustic bassist Dave Holland (here playing cello) and guitarist Derek Bailey recorded in 1971 and released on the ECM label. It is the second project in Holland’s long relationship with ECM.

Reception
Allmusic awarded the album 3 stars.  Todd S. Jenkins called the album "a dark resonant masterwork".

Track listing
All compositions by Dave Holland & Derek Bailey.

 "Improvised Piece III – 20:04  
 "Improvised Piece IV" – 8:16  
 "Improvised Piece V" – 10:08

Personnel
David Holland – cello
Derek Bailey – guitar

References

ECM Records live albums
Dave Holland live albums
Derek Bailey (guitarist) live albums
1971 live albums
Albums produced by Manfred Eicher